B-Sides is an EP by French avant-garde metal band Pin-Up Went Down, and their third release overall. It was independently-released by the band on 10 November 2012, being available for download on their official Bandcamp page. As its name implies, it is a collection of outtakes from their two studio albums, 2 Unlimited and 342, and at the time was meant to serve as a teaser for their unreleased third studio album, Perfreaktion.

Track listing

Personnel
 Aurélie Raidron (Asphodel) – vocals, photography, cover art
 Alexis Damien – vocals, guitars, bass, keyboards, piano, drums, production, mixing, mastering
 Romain Greffe – keyboards (on tracks 2 and 3)

References

External links
 Pin-Up Went Down's official website

2012 EPs
Pin-Up Went Down albums